Guamá is a municipality in the Santiago de Cuba Province of Cuba. The municipal seat is located in the town of Chivirico. It was named after Guamá, the Taíno cacique who led a rebellion against the Spanish 1530s.

Geography
Guamá is located in the south-west of the province, and contains most of the Caribbean Sea coast west of Santiago de Cuba. It includes the town of Chivirico and the villages of Aserradero, Buey Cabón, Caletón Blanco, Cañizo, Cayo Damas, Dos Ríos, El Francés, El Macho, Guamá Abajo, Juan González, La Magdalena, La Mula, La Plata, La Uvita, Las Cuevas, Ocujal, Quiebra Seca, Río Seco and Uvero.

The Pico Turquino, the highest Cuban peak, is located within the municipality.

Demographics
In 2004, the municipality of Guamá had a population of 35,516.

Transport
The entire municipal coastline is crossed from east to west by the state highway "Circuito Sur de Oriente" (CSO) or Granma Road, which runs along Cuba's southern coast from Santiago de Cuba to the province of Granma.

See also
List of cities in Cuba
Municipalities of Cuba

References

External links

 Guamá webpage on santiago.cu

Populated places in Santiago de Cuba Province